Senbi Kiyamba (1467–1508) was a Meitei monarch and a ruler of Kangleipak kingdom (Manipur kingdom). He was the son of Medingu Ningthou Khomba and his warrior queen Leima Linthoingambi. Born Thangwai Ningthouba, he succeeded his father at the age of 24. He took the name Kiyamba meaning "Conqueror of Kyang", after conquering the Shan kingdom in the Kabaw Valley in alliance with King Choupha Khe Khomba of Pong in 1470.

Pheiya

In celebration of their victory over Kyang, the King of Pong presented Kiyamba with a golden box containing a stone known as Pheiya (Almighty). During this period, Bramins migrated to Manipur. Legend states that a Brahmin identified Pheiya as Vishnu and said that good fortune would come to the king and kingdom if rice boiled in cow's milk was offered to the deity. Lamangdong was subsequently named Bishnupur (Abode of Vishnu) in honour of the temple.

Edicts and inscriptions 

The royal chronicle Cheitharol Kumbaba dates from this time and is one of the primary texts in the Meitei script. Kiyamba's royal edicts have been found in the script in a stone inscription at Khoibu in Tengnoupal district.

Cheithaba

In 1485, Kiyamba introduced a system for counting years called Cheithaba, by which each year is named for a person who would take responsibility for the suffering of the kingdom during that year.

References

Meitei royalty
1467 births
1508 deaths
Sanamahists
Ningthoucha dynasty